The following is a list of ingredients used in Burmese cuisine. Burmese cuisine utilizes a wide array of vegetables and fruits. Due to influences from India and China, most Burmese dishes use a much wider variety of ingredients than the Indian or Chinese cuisines.

Ingredients used in Burmese dishes are often fresh. Many fruits are used in conjunction with vegetables in many dishes. The Burmese eat a great variety of vegetables and fruits, and many kinds of meat.

Herbs and spices

Fresh herbs and spices
 Sweet basil (ပင်စိမ်းမွှေး)
 Cha-om, Acacia pennata leaves (ဆူးပုပ်ရွက်)
 Garlic (ကြက်သွန်ဖြူ)
 Ginger (ချင်း)
 Chili (ငရုတ်သီး အစိမ်း/အခြောက်), dried as well as green
 Chinese chives (ဂျူးဖူ)
 Galangal (ပတဲကော)
 Green onions (ကြက်သွန်မြိတ်)
 Coriander / cilantro (နံနံပင်)
 Curry leaf (ပျဉ်းတော်သိမ်)
 Malaphu (မာလာဖူး)
 Lemongrass (စပါးလင်)
 Kaffir lime leaves (ရှောက်နူ)
 Mint (ပူစီနံပင်)
 Mustard leaf (မုန့်ညှင်းရွက်)
 Onion (ကြက်သွန်နီ )
 Pandan (ဆွမ်းမွှေး)
 black Pepper (ငရုတ်ကောင်း)
 Tamarind (မန်ကျည်း)

Dried herbs and spices
 Aniseed (စမုန်စပါး)
 Bay leaf (ကရဝေးရွက်)
 Black cumin (စမုန်နက်)
 Cardamom (ဖာလာစေ့)
 Cinnamon (သစ်ဂျပိုး)
 Cloves (လေးညှင်းပွင့်)
 Cumin (ဇီယာ)
 Five spice powder (တရုတ်မဆလာ)
 Masala (မဆလာမှုန့်)
 Paprika (အရောင်တင်မှုန့် or ငရုတ်သီးမှုန့်)
 Peanut (မြေပဲ)
 Perilla seed (ရှမ်းနှမ်းစေ့)
 Poppy seed (ဘိန်းစေ့)
 Sesame seeds (နှမ်း)
 Turmeric (နနွင်း)

Pastes, sauces, and condiments
 Ngapi (စိမ်းစား ငပိ/မျှင်ငပိ) - fermented fish paste
 Fish sauce (ငံပြာရည်)
 Pon ye gyi (ပုန်းရည်ကြီး), a fermented bean paste
 Pe ngapi (ပဲငါးပိ), fermented soybean paste
 Fermented bean sprouts (ပဲတီချဉ်)
 Fermented sesame cake (နှမ်းဖက်ချဉ်)
 Fish paste (ရေကြိုငပိ or ငပိရေကြိုရာတွင်သုံးသော ငပိ)
 Fermented bean cake (ပဲဖက်ချဉ်)
 Shrimp paste, belacan (စိမ်းစားငပိ/မျှင်ငပိ)
 Soy sauce (ပဲငံပြာရည်)

Vegetables
 Asiatic pennywort (မြင်းခွာရွက်)
 asparagus (ကညွှတ်)
 bean sprouts (ပဲပင်ပေါက်)
 bitter gourd (ကြက်ဟင်းခါးသီး)
 cabbage (ဂေါ်ဖီထုပ်)
 carrot (ခါကြက်ဥနီ)
 cauliflower (ပန်းဂေါ်ဖီ/ပန်းပွင့်)
 chayote (ဂေါ်ရခါးသီး)
 Chinese cabbage (မုန်ညှင်းဖြူ)
 cucumber (သခွားသီး)
 Daikon or white radish (မုံလာဥဖြူ), pickled (မုံလာဥချဉ်)
 drumstick, Moringa oleifera (ဒန့်သလွန်သီး)
 eggplant (ခရမ်းသီး)
 gourd (ဘူးသီး) and the young vine (ဘူးညွှန့်)
 green bean (ပဲတောင့်ရှည်)
 Gai lan (ကိုက်လန်)
 lettuce (ဆလတ်ရွက်)
 mustard greens (မုံညှင်းရွက်), pickled (မုံညှင်းချဉ်)
 haricot bean (ပဲကြီး)
 neem leaves, margosa(တမာ ရွက်)
 okra, lady's finger (ရုံးပတီသီး)
 Oroxylum_indicum, Indian Trumpet fruit (ကြောင်လျှာသီး)
 plumeria alba (တရုတ်စကား)
 potato (အာလူး)
 pumpkin (ရွှေဖရုံသီး)
 ridged gourd (ခဝဲသီး)
 roselle leaves (ချဉ်ပေါင်ရွက်)
 snake gourd (ပဲလင်းမြွေသီး)
 Scallion Spring onions (ကြက်သွန်မြိတ်)
 sesbania grandiflora (ပေါက်ပန်းဖြူ)
 tindora (ကင်းပုံ)
 tomato (ခရမ်းချဉ်သီး)
 water spinach (ကန်စွန်းရွက်)
 winter melon (ကျောက်ဖရုံသီး)

Lentils
 Black-eyed pea (ပဲလွမ်း)
 Butter bean (ထောပတ်ပဲ)
 Chickpea (ကုလားပဲ )
 Chickpea flour (ပဲမှုန့် )
Lablab bean (ပဲကြီး)
 Lentils (ပဲနီကလေး or ပဲရာဇာ)
 Urad dal, black lentil (မတ်ပဲ )
 winged bean (ပဲစောင်းလျား)

Roots
 Bamboo shoot (မျှစ်)
banana stem (ငှက်ပျောအူ)
 Chinese chive roots (ဂျူးမြှစ်)
Jicama (စိမ်းစားဥ)
Sweet potato (ကန်စွန်းဥ)
Taro corn (ပိန်းဥ)

Pickles
 sour fermented bamboo shoot (မျှစ်ချဉ်)
 sour fermented green mango, pressed(သရက်သီးသနပ်/သရက်ချဉ်)

Oils
 Chili oil (ငရုတ်ဆီ)
 Si-Chet (ဆီချက်), toasted peanut oil that is often used to dress salads 
 Peanut oil (ပဲဆီ 
 Sesame oil (နှမ်းဆီ )

Staple foods and other starches
 Paw hsan hmwe
 Glutinous rice (ကောက်ညှင်း ), purple variety (ငချိတ် )
 Rice flour (ဆန်မှုန့် )
Glutinous rice flour (ကောက်ညှင်းမှုန့်)
Semolina (ရွှေချီမှုန့်)

Edible fungi
 mushrooms (မှို )
Tree fungi (မှိုခြောက်)
Wood ear (အဖိုးကြီးနားရွက်)

Fruits and nuts
 coconut (အုန်းသီး)
 djenkol (ဒိန်ညှင်း/တညှင်းသီး)
 kaffir lime (ရှောက်သီး)
 lime (သံပရာသီး)
 luffa (သပွတ်သီး)
 mango (သရက်သီး), green as well as ripe
 santol (သစ်တိုသီး)
 Myanma grape  heritiera fomes  (ကနစိုသီး)
 soap nut  (ကင်ပွန်းသီး)
 water chestnut  (ကျွဲခေါင်းသီး)
 rambutan  (ကြက်မောက်သီး)
 betel-nut  (ကွမ်းသီး)
 pomelo   (ကျွဲကောသီး)
 star fruit   (စောင်းလျားသီး)
 rose apple  (ဇမ္ဗူသပြေသီး)
 persimmon  (တည္သီး)
 avocado  (ထောပတ်သီး)
 palm  (ထန်းသီး)
 durian  (ဒူးရင်းသီး)
 jack fruit  (ပိန္နဲသီး)
 Terminalia (ဖန္ခါးသီး)
 almond  ဗာဒံသီး (ဗန္ဒါသီး)
 eggplant  (မရမ်းသီး)
 guava  (မာလကာသီး)
 mangosteen  (မင်းဂွတ်သီး)
 damson  (မက်မန်းသီး)
 peach  (မက္မံုသီး)
 morinda  (ရဲယိုသီး)
 acorn  (၀က္သစ္ခ်သီး)
 pomegranate  (သလဲသီး)
 fig  (သဖန်းသီး)
 sapota  (သၾကားသီး)
 jump plum  (သပြေသီး)
 papaya  (သင်္ဘောသီး)
 wood apple  (သီးသီး)
 star gooseberry  (သင်္ဘောဆီးဖြူသီး)
 sugar apple  (ဩဇာသီး)

Meat and poultry
 beef (အမဲသား)
 chicken (ကြက်သား)
 duck (ဘဲသား) 
 chicken/duck/quail egg (ကြက်ဥ/ဘဲဥ/ငုံးဥ)
 goat / mutton (ဆိတ်သား/သိုးသား)
 pork (ဝက်သား)
 Venison (အမဲလိုက်ခြင်းမှ ရရှိသော 'တော' ကောင်သား) - game Meat

Fish and seafood
 Barramundi (ကကတစ်)
 catfish (ငါးခူ )
 Daggertooth pike conger (ငါးရွှေ)
 eel (ငါးရှဉ့်)
 hilsa (ငါးသလောက်)
 mahseer (ငါးဒုတ်)
 mudfish (ငါးရံ့)
 Bronze featherback (ငါးဖယ်)
 Rohu (ငါးမြစ်ချင်း)
 Mrigal (ငါးချင်း)
 Prawn (ပုစွန်)
 Snapper (ငါးပါးနီ)

Processed seafood products
 bombay duck (အာပဲ့ခြောက်)
 dried fish (ငါးခြောက် )
 dried shrimp (ပုစွန်ခြောက် )
 Salted fish (ငါးဆားနယ် or ငါးပိကောင်)
 Ngachin (ငါးချဉ်) - pickled fish, fermented and pressed 
 Pickled shrimp (ပုစွန်ချဉ်) - pickled shrimp, fermented and pressed

References

See also 
Cuisine of Myanmar

Burmese cuisine
Myanmar-related lists